Ayandeh (in Persian: آینده, meaning 'the future') may refer to:

 Ayandeh (journal) - a Persian journal of Iranian studies founded in 1925 by Dr. Mahmood Afshar
 Ayandeh (polling organisation) - an opinion poll organisation in Iran that was closed down in 2002